The Image of Chile Foundation, or Fundación Imagen de Chile in Spanish, is an organization that coordinates work carried out to promote Chile abroad.

Organization

The Foundation is a private nonprofit organization created on 8 May 2009. It is governed by a Board of Directors, which defines its overall policies and courses of action. The board consists of 19 members: the Minister of Foreign Affairs (who presides), the Minister of the Economy, the President of the National Council of Culture and the Arts ("Consejo Nacional de la Cultura y las Artes"), and 16 other members elected by the Minister of Foreign Affairs.

Although the Foundation is a private organization, its board of directors is formed and presided over by government ministers, applies and complies with state policies, and is funded by public resources.

Its mission is to “promote the country internationally" and it carries out this mission by guiding, advising and supporting public and private organizations and individuals whose initiatives aim to enhance and promote the image and reputation of Chile, in an increasingly competitive international context.

Role and main goal 

The role of the Foundation is to manage the nation’s brand ("marca país"), organizing the work of the main entities that contribute to the country's image, such as culture, sports, exports, investment, tourism and international relations, among others.

It develops alliances with stakeholders in the public and private sectors, in order to create one unified message about Chile and promote the distinctive attributes of Chile's identity.

Primary goal

The main task of the Foundation is to manage the country’s brand, 
increasing the positive impression Chile makes with other nations. To achieve this, it implements activities designed to strengthen the country’s reputation, highlighting Chile’s distinctive qualities, and speaks on behalf of the public and private sectors to position Chile on the highly competitive global stage. In doing so, the Foundation aims to expand and consolidate opportunities to attract talent, exports, foreign investment, tourism, international relations, social and cultural links, and much more.

Legal framework
  Reglamento del Comité Ejecutivo de Fundación Imagen de Chile
 Estatutos Fundación Imagen de Chile (Imagen de Chile Foundation statutes)
 “Título XXXIII, del Libro Primero del Código Civil” (Civil Code Title XXXIII)

See also
 Chile
 Nation branding

References

External links 
 Página web Fundación Imagen de Chile

Tourism in Chile
Cultural organisations based in Chile
Economy of Chile
Types of branding
Investment promotion agencies
Cultural diplomacy